Wangnitzsee is a lake in the Mecklenburg Lake District, in the German state of Mecklenburg-Vorpommern. It is situated in the district of Mecklenburgische Seenplatte.

The navigable River Havel briefly flows through the Wangnitzsee, both entering and exiting at the west end of the lake. The river enters from a  channel from Wesenberg and the Woblitzsee, and exiting directly into the Großer Priepertsee. The lake itself is navigable to its eastern end, and navigation is administered as part of the Obere–Havel–Wasserstraße.

References 

Lakes of Mecklenburg-Western Pomerania
Federal waterways in Germany